Torres Airport  is an airfield serving the Torres Islands in the Torba province in Vanuatu. It is located on Linua island, just north of Lo (or Loh) island.

Airlines and destinations

References

External links
 

Airports in Vanuatu
Torba Province